Lutra euxena is an extinct species of otter that was endemic to Malta during the middle to late Pleistocene. The species likely went extinct because of human activity.

Evolutionary history 
The species lived in Malta between 2.588 and 0.012 Ma., having a relatively equal size to its mainland counterpart. It along with its Mediterranean counterparts colonized islands by crossing sea channels that were up to 30 km across. Over time, these otters adopted a more land-based lifestyle, eating small mammals on islands alongside fish and shellfish. It was discovered by John Bate.

References 

Extinct carnivorans
Fauna of Malta
Mustelidae
Species described in 2006